Association Sportive Kaloum , also known as A.S.K, is a football club based in Conakry, Guinea. In the 1960s A.S.K was known as Conakry I, and won three titles under that name.

Due to the problems in sponsoring in 2008, the club was relegated to Ligue 2.

Achievements

National
Guinée Championnat National: 13
Champion: 1965, 1969, 1970, 1980, 1981, 1984, 1987, 1993, 1995, 1996, 1998, 2007, 2014

Guinée Coupe Nationale: 7
Winner:: 1985, 1997, 1998, 2001, 2005, 2007, 2015

Guinée Super Coupe: 1
Winner: 2015

 Tournoi Ruski Alumini: 2
 2003, 2007

International
 CAF Cup: 0
Runner-up: 1992

 UFOA Cup: 0
Runner-up: 1977

Performance in CAF competitions

1 US Gorée withdrew
2 Invincible Eleven withdrew

Statistics
Best position: Semifinalist (continental)
Best position at cup competitions: Quarterfinals
Appearances at the CAF championship competitions: 14
Appearances at the CAF cup competitions: 10
Best position at the CAF Cup: Finalist
Appearances at the CAF Cup: 3
Total goals scored at the CAF championship competitions: 64
Total matches played at the CAF Cup: 12
Total home matches played at the CAF Cup: 6
Total away matches played at the CAF Cup: 6

Current squad
As of March 2015.

Chairmen
Bouba Sampil Camara
Aboubacar Sampil

Managers
 Pascal Janin (in 2014)
 François Zaoui

References

 
Football clubs in Guinea
Sport in Conakry